
Gmina Łubnice is a rural gmina (administrative district) in Staszów County, Świętokrzyskie Voivodeship, in south-central Poland.

Demography 
According to the 2011 Poland census, there were 4,382 people residing in Łubnice Commune, of whom 48.6% were male and 51.4% were female. In the commune, the population was spread out, with 19.2% under the age of 18, 37.8% from 18 to 44, 21.5% from 45 to 64, and 21.5% who were 65 years of age or older.
 Figure 1. Population pyramid of commune in 2010 – by age group and sex

Villages
Gmina Łubnice contains the villages and settlements of Beszowa, Borki, Budziska, Czarzyzna, Gace Słupieckie, Góra, Grabowa, Łubnice, Łyczba, Orzelec Duży, Orzelec Mały, Przeczów, Rejterówka, Słupiec, Szczebrzusz, Wilkowa, Wolica, Zalesie and Zofiówka.

Neighbouring gminas
Gmina Łubnice is bordered by the gminas of Czermin, Oleśnica, Pacanów, Połaniec, Rytwiany and Szczucin.

References

External links
Polish official population figures 2006

Lubnice
Staszów County